Twinbird Corporation, founded in 1951, is a manufacturer of household electric products with headquarters in Tsubame City, Niigata Prefecture, Japan. Shigekatsu Nomizu is the President, employing 284 people as of March 2010.	

It was founded as a plating company in 1951. In the 1980s it expanded into small electrical appliances and began developing products occasionally in conjunction with other companies. The free-piston Stirling cooler is one such product that was developed jointly and under license to Global Cooling. By 2002, Twinbird released the first ever consumer product utilizing the free-piston Stirling cycle process. Before this, free-piston Stirling machines were only available at extremely high cost generally used for specialized aerospace applications. A branded version of a portable refrigerator using the free-piston Stirling cooler was sold for a time by the Coleman Company.

References

External links
 Twinbird homepage

Home appliance manufacturers of Japan
Companies based in Niigata Prefecture
Manufacturing companies established in 1951
Japanese brands
Companies listed on the Tokyo Stock Exchange
1951 establishments in Japan